Bing: A Musical Autobiography was Bing Crosby's fourth Decca vinyl LP, recorded and  released in 1954.

Background
Ready to retire by 1954, Crosby assembled Buddy Cole and his Trio, a small group formed from members of the John Scott Trotter Orchestra, and re-recorded many of his early hits between April and June 1954. The Decca masters were used for his hits, starting with the 1938 recording of "Small Fry"  Most of the new recordings were done at the American Legion Hall in Palm Springs, California.

Crosby's memoir, Call Me Lucky, was published in June 1953 by Simon & Schuster. It was written with Pete Martin.

Discs
Starting in 1958, Decca released the LPs separately.

The LPs were issued as automatic couplings which would enable the five LPs to be played on an autochanger record player in chronological sequence. For instance, within album set DX-151, LP no. DL 8072 contained sides 1 and 10, DL 8073 sides 2 and 9, DL 8074 sides 3 and 8, DL 8075 sides 4 and 7, DL 8076 sides 5 and 6.

The Musical Autobiography tracks were reissued as a four-CD set in Japan in 1992 without change from the original five LPs (MCA (Japan). Avid Entertainment in the UK released a four disc set in 2005 but with the addition of soundtrack and  film promotional material from the 1930s.

Reception
In an enthusiastic review of the set, John S. Wilson wrote in The New York Times, "The first half of the program in which Crosby talks about his early days and sings his early hits is an unalloyed joy, a field day for nostalgians. In view of complaints that have been made off and on for the past fifteen years that the Crosby voice was gone, that he no longer had the old touch, it is a particular pleasure to hear these early songs recorded within the past year, sung with all the old Crosby ease and charm...This is an exceptional collection of recordings, the summation of a landmark in American popular music and well worth the asking price."

At Allmusic John Bush called A Musical Autobiography "the most laborious exercise in Crosby's entire career, narrating a career history and re-recording dozens of songs." It was also issued to commemorate Decca's 20th anniversary.

Billboard reported, "Decca's merchandising displays consist of a lifelike window or floor display of Bing Crosby, mounted on an easel and with Crosby holding a copy of his musical autobiography titled simple, 'Bing.' This set...is the firm's big push for the fall."

Personnel for re-recordings
 Buddy Cole – piano and organ
 Perry Botkin – guitar 
 Don Whitaker – bass
 Nick Fatool – drums

Track listing

Bonus tracks (2005 CD release)
When Bing: A Musical Autobiography was re-released as a 4-CD set in 2005, the label added bonus tracks that had no connection with the original album. These tracks were sourced from Bing Crosby's radio shows, publicity discs, and his short film soundtracks.

Paris Honeymoon selection (from Kraft Music Hall, June 28, 1945):
 Banter between Ken Carpenter and Bing Crosby – 1.14
 "The Funny Old Hills" (Ralph Rainger/Leo Robin) – 1.29
 Banter between Carpenter and Crosby – 0.37
 "You're a Sweet Little Headache" (Rainger/Robin) – 1.12
 Banter between Carpenter and Crosby – 0.36
 "I Have Eyes" (Rainger/Robin) – 2.10

The Star Maker selection (from Kraft Music Hall, April 19, 1945):
 Banter between Ken and Crosby – 1.06
 "An Apple for the Teacher" (Monaco/Burke) – 0.47
 Banter between Carpenter and Crosby – 0.21
 "Still the Bluebird Sings" (Monaco/Burke) – 0.40
 Banter between Carpenter and Crosby – 0.16
 "A Man and His Dream" (Monaco/Burke) – 1.57

I Surrender Dear 1931 film soundtrack selection:
 "I Surrender Dear" – 1.31
 "Out of Nowhere" – 1.08
 "At Your Command" (Harry Barris/Harry Tobias/Bing Crosby) – 1.55

One More Chance 1931 film soundtrack selection:
 "Magic C.O.D." (a parody of "I Surrender Dear") – 1.07
 "Wrap Your Troubles in Dreams" – 2.22
 "I'd Climb the Highest Mountain" (Lew Brown/Sidney Clare) – 1.03
 "Just One More Chance" (Arthur Johnston/Sam Coslow) – 3.22

Dream House 1931 film soundtrack selection:
 "When I Take My Sugar to Tea"(Sammy Fain/Irving Kahal/Pierre Norman) – 0.48
 "It Must Be True" (Harry Barris/ Gus Arnheim/Gordon Clifford) – 1.18
 "Dream House" (Earle Foxe/Lynn F. Cowan) – 1.11

Billboard Girl 1931 film soundtrack selection:
 "Were You Sincere?" (Vincent Rose/Jack Meskill) – 1.24
 "For You" (Joe Burke/Al Dubin) – 1.11

Sing, Bing, Sing 1932 film soundtrack selection:
 "In My Hideaway" (K. L. Binford) – 1.22
 "Between the Devil and the Deep Blue Sea" – 0.50
 "Lovable" (Harry M. Woods/Gus Kahn) – 1.12
 "Snuggled on Your Shoulder" – 1.48

Blue of the Night 1932 film soundtrack selection:
 "My Silent Love" (Dana Suesse/Edward Heyman) – 0.35
 "Auf Wiedersehen, My Dear" (Milton Ager/Ed G. Nelson/Al Hoffman /Al Goodhart) – 1.41
 "Ev'ry Time My Heart Beats" (Benny Davis/Gerald Marks) – 1.39
 "Where the Blue of the Night (Meets the Gold of the Day)" – 2.37

From The Big Broadcast publicity discs:
 Banter between Stuart Erwin and Bing Crosby (take 1) – 1.18
 "Here Lies Love" (take 1) (Rainger/Robin) – 3.13
 Announcement by Sam Coslow – 1.41
 "Please" (Rainger/Robin) – 2.35

Please film soundtrack selection:
 "You're Getting to Be a Habit with Me" – 1.12
 "I Don't Stand a Ghost of a Chance with You" – 2.09
 "Please" (Rainger/Robin) – 1.49

From She Loves Me Not publicity discs:
 "Love in Bloom" (with Kitty Carlisle) – 3.26
 "Straight from the Shoulder" (with Kitty Carlisle) (Harry Revel/Mack Gordon) – 3.28
 "I'm Hummin', I'm Whistlin', I'm Singin'" (Revel/Gordon) – 3.15

From Two for Tonight publicity discs:
 "Two for Tonight" (Revel/Gordon) – 3.32

From Doctor Rhythm publicity discs:
 Introduction by Gayne Whitman – 0.47
 "This Is My Night to Dream" (Monaco/Burke) – 2.53
 "On the Sentimental Side" (Monaco/Burke) – 1.35
 "Only a Gypsy Knows" (with Beatrice Lillie) (Monaco/Burke) – 2.42
 "My Heart Is Taking Lessons" (Monaco/Burke) – 2.31

From Birth of the Blues publicity discs:
 "The Waiter and the Porter and the Upstairs Maid" (with Mary Martin and Jack Teagarden) (Johnny Mercer) – 4.05
 "My Melancholy Baby" – 2.35

From The Big Broadcast publicity discs:
 Banter between Stuart Erwin and Bing Crosby (take 2) – 1.13
 "Here Lies Love" (take 2) (Rainger/Robin) – 3.15

References

Bing Crosby albums
1954 albums
Decca Records albums
Albums produced by Buddy Cole (musician)